Les Andelys (Norman: Les Aundelys) is a commune in the northern French department of Eure, in Normandy.

Geography

History
Grand Andely, founded, according to tradition, in the 6th century, has a church (13th, 14th and 15th centuries) parts of which are of fine late Gothic and Renaissance architecture. The works of art in the interior include beautiful stained glass of the latter period. Other interesting buildings are the hôtel du Grand Cerf dating from the first half of the 16th century, and the chapel of Sainte-Clotilde, close by a spring which, owing to its supposed healing powers, is the object of a pilgrimage. Grand Andely has a statue of Nicolas Poussin, a native of the place. Petit Andely sprang up at the foot of the eminence on which stands the Château Gaillard, now in ruins, but formerly one of the strongest fortresses in France. It was built by Richard I of England at the end of the 12th century to protect the Norman frontier, was captured by the French in 1204 and passed finally into their possession in 1449. The church of St Sauveur at Petit Andely also dates from the end of the 12th century.

Population

Sights
 Château Gaillard, a medieval castle, is located in Les Andelys.
 13th-17th century Church of Our Lady, Grand-Andely
 13th century Church of Saint-Sauveur, Petit-Andely
 Sainte Clotilde Miraculous Spring
 The Seine Banks
 The half-timbered houses of Petit Andely

Personalities
Les Andelys was the birthplace of:
 Adrianus Turnebus (1512–1565), classical scholar
 Nicolas Poussin (1594–1665), painter
 Jean-Pierre Blanchard (1753–1809), balloonist, first man to cross the English Channel by air
 Charles Joshua Chaplin (1825–1891), painter
 Henry Torrès (1891–1966), trial lawyer, politician, and writer

Sir John Woodroffe (1865–1936), lawyer and writer on Indian philosophy and Tantra, lived there from 1920 until his death.

See also
Communes of the Eure department
Treaty of Louviers

References

External links

Promenade of the Andelys country (in French)
Les Andelys City Guide
Les Andelys News (in French)
 Les Andelys holds France's second largest town flea market, the 'La Grande Foire à Tout des Andelys' every September. A mix of brocante, local produce and associations; review here.

Communes of Eure
Subprefectures in France